Zill-e-Shah is a 2008 Pakistani Punjabi-language film and is the sequel to another Punjabi film from 2006, Majajan.

Plot 

Kulsoom (Noor) is engaged to Sarwar Shah (Babar Butt), but she is deeply in love with Zill-e-Shah (Shan), whom she knows from childhood. So Kulsoom's marriage is sealed, but in an encounter Zill-e-Shah kills Sarwar, therefore he is sent to Jail for his murder.

Then an unfortunate incident occurs, when Kulsoom marries Abid Shah (Shafqat Cheema), the elder brother of Sarwar. Noor is in discomfort, but so is Zill-e-Shah, as he gives up his life of luxury, and goes in the realm of dancing girls and becomes an alcoholic. Soon he meets  Sitara (Saima) a dancer, who he falls in love with.

Cast

Film release 
Zill-e-Shah became the first film in the history of Lollywood to be re-released in cinema houses across the country, within only a few weeks of it completing its first run at the box-office.

Accolades

Production 
Made on a budget of around two crore rupees, Zill-e-Shah attracted much popular attention because of its print ads but also due to its promotional videos that ran on the various local TV channels. 

The producer said:
"The entire post-production work of Zill e Shah was done in Mumbai's famous Adlabs. It happens to be one of the world's most expensive production houses. Whoever had a chance to watch the rushes simply loved the film. I was hoping for a grand premiere in India, but I don't know if that will be possible now, given the current political situation between the two countries."

References

2000s Punjabi-language films
Punjabi-language Pakistani films
2008 films
Films directed by Shaan Shahid
Pakistani sequel films